The Royal Philharmonic Society Music Awards are given annually for live classical music-making in the United Kingdom. The awards were first held in 1989 and are independent of any commercial interest.

Since 2003, BBC Radio 3 has been the media partners of the awards and all the winners are celebrated in a full-length "Performance on 3" broadcast.  

The Royal Philharmonic Society, founded in 1813, is a registered UK Charity dedicated to creating a future for music.  It is one of the world's oldest music societies with a membership including both professional musicians and music lovers. Nominations for its awards are invited annually from members of the society, members of the music profession and UK musical organisations. Each category is decided by an independent jury who is asked to judge the nominations on the criteria of creativity, excellence and understanding.  Recipients each receive a handcrafted silver lyre trophy made by the silversmith Julie Jones.

Thirteen awards are given annually with categories for performers, composers, programmers, audience engagement, communication and learning and participation. There is no restriction on the nationality of recipients. The awards are presented each May at a dinner in London. Each year the presentation is made by an eminent musician and a distinguished cultural figure is invited to address the guests. Recent speakers have included Dame Liz Forgan, Richard Holloway, Nicholas Hytner, Jude Kelly, Alan Rusbridger, Armando Iannucci, Neil MacGregor, Grayson Perry, Mark Ravenhill and Gareth Malone.

Winner

Instrumentalist
Source:
 1990 Håkan Hardenberger
 1991 Evelyn Glennie
 1992 Geoffrey Parsons
 1993 Steven Isserlis
 1994 Iona Brown
 1995 András Schiff
 1996 Itzhak Perlman
 1997 Julian Bream
 1998 Murray Perahia
 1999 Graham Johnson
 2000 Leif Ove Andsnes
 2001 Piotr Anderszewski
 2002 Thomas Trotter
 2003 Paul Lewis
 2004 Mitsuko Uchida
 2005 Pierre-Laurent Aimard
 2006 Anthony Marwood
 2007 Michael Collins
 2008 Imogen Cooper
 2009 Janine Jansen
 2010 Stephen Hough
 2011 Leon Fleisher
 2012 Maurizio Pollini
 2013 Steven Osborne
 2014 Patricia Kopatchinskaja
 2015 Colin Currie
 2016 Daniil Trifonov
 2017 James Ehnes
 2018 Igor Levit
 2019 Alina Ibragimova
 2020 Lawrence Power

Conductor
Source:
 1990 Simon Rattle
 1991 Andrew Davis
 1992 Klaus Tennstedt
 1993 Edward Downes
 1994 Colin Davis
 1995 Nikolaus Harnoncourt
 1996 Richard Hickox
 1997 Richard Armstrong
 1998 Esa-Pekka Salonen
 1999 Bernard Haitink
 2000 Sir Charles Mackerras
 2001 Pierre Boulez
 2002 Osmo Vänskä
 2003 Marin Alsop
 2004 Mariss Jansons
 2005 Antonio Pappano
 2006 Mark Elder
 2007 Vladimir Jurowski
 2008 Edward Gardner
 2009 Valery Gergiev
 2010 Oliver Knussen
 2011 Iván Fischer
 2012 Claudio Abbado
 2013 Kirill Karabits
 2014 Daniel Barenboim
 2015 Andris Nelsons
 2016 Sakari Oramo
 2017 Richard Farnes
 2018 Vladimir Jurowski
 2019 Mirga Gražinytė-Tyla
 2020 Dalia Stasevska

Singer
Source:
 1990 Philip Langridge
 1991 Anne Sofie von Otter
 1992 John Tomlinson
 1993 Julia Varady
 1994 Galina Gorchakova
 1995 Simon Keenlyside
 1996 Anthony Michaels-Moore
 1997 Bryn Terfel
 1998 Joan Rodgers
 1999 John Tomlinson
 2000 David Daniels
 2001 Gerald Finley
 2002 Violeta Urmana
 2003 Lisa Saffer
 2004 Susan Chilcott ([posthumous)
 2005 Ben Heppner
 2006 Joyce DiDonato
 2007 John Mark Ainsley
 2008 John Tomlinson
 2009 Susan Bullock
 2010 Philip Langridge
 2011 Susan Bickley
 2012 Toby Spence
 2013 Sarah Connolly
 2014 Joyce DiDonato
 2015 Christian Gerhaher
 2016 Roderick Williams
 2017 Karita Mattila
 2018 Allan Clayton
 2019 Nina Stemme
 2020 Natalya Romaniw

Large-Scale Composition
Source:
 1990 Olivier Messiaen
 1991 Poul Ruders
 1992 Harrison Birtwistle
 1993 Magnus Lindberg
 1994 Witold Lutoslawski
 1995 Peter Maxwell Davies
 1996 Michael Tippett
 1997 Colin Matthews
 1998 Thomas Adès
 1999 Henri Dutilleux
 2000 Gérard Grisey
 2001 Wolfgang Rihm
 2002 Peter Eötvös
 2003 George Benjamin
 2004 Harrison Birtwistle
 2005 Thomas Adès: The Tempest
 2006 Julian Anderson: The Book of Hours
 2007 Jonathan Harvey: ...towards a pure land
 2008 Thomas Adès: Tevot
 2009 George Benjamin: Into the Little Hill
 2010 Kaija Saariaho: Notes on Light
 2011 James Dillon: Nine Rivers
 2012 Jonathan Harvey: Messages
 2013 Gerald Barry: The Importance of Being Earnest
 2014 George Benjamin: Written On Skin
 2015 Hans Abrahamsen: Let me tell you...
 2016 Luca Francesconi: Duende, The Dark Notes: violin concerto
 2017 Philip Venables: 4.48 Psychosis
 2018 Mark-Anthony Turnage: Hibiki
 2019 Rebecca Saunders: Yes
 2020 Frank Denyer: The Fish that Became the Sun (Songs of the Dispossessed)

Chamber-Scale Composition
Source:
 1990 Simon Holt
 1991 Harrison Birtwistle
 1992 Barry Guy
 1993 Oliver Knussen
 1994 John Adams
 1995 Luciano Berio
 1996 Brian Ferneyhough
 1997 Elliott Carter: String Quartet No. 5
 1998 James Dillon
 1999 Pierre Boulez
 2000 Hans Werner Henze
 2001 György Ligeti
 2002 Simon Holt
 2003 James Dillon
 2004 Helmut Lachenmann
 2005 Howard Skempton
 2006 James Dillon: String Quartet No. 4
 2007 Richard Causton: Phoenix
 2008 Rebecca Saunders: Stirrings Still
 2009 Harrison Birtwistle: The Tree of Strings
 2010 Kevin Volans
 2011 Brian Ferneyhough: String Quartet No. 6
 2012 Sally Beamish: Reed Stanzas (String Quartet No. 3)
 2013 Rebecca Saunders: Fletch
 2014 Harrison Birtwistle: The Moth Requiem
 2015 Graham Fitkin: Distil
 2016 Julian Anderson: Van Gogh Blue
 2017 Rebecca Saunders: Skin
 2018 James Dillon: Tanz/haus Triptych 2017
 2019 Tansy Davies: Cave
 2020 Naomi Pinnock: I am, I am

References

External links
 RPS Awards
 Past Recipients
 Royal Philharmonic Society
 BBC Radio 3

British music awards
Classical music awards
Royal Philharmonic Society
Awards established in 1989
Recurring events established in 1989
1989 establishments in the United Kingdom